The Burgsandstein Formation is the Bavarian name for the Löwenstein Formation, a geologic formation in south Germany. It preserves fossils dating back to the Triassic period.

See also
 Löwenstein Formation

 List of fossiliferous stratigraphic units in Germany

References
 

Triassic Germany